Chlorhoda is a genus of moths in the subfamily Arctiinae erected by George Hampson in 1901.

Species
Chlorhoda albolimbata
Chlorhoda amabilis
Chlorhoda metaleuca
Chlorhoda metamelaena
Chlorhoda pallens
Chlorhoda rubricosta
Chlorhoda rufolivacea
Chlorhoda rufoviridis
Chlorhoda superba
Chlorhoda thoracica
Chlorhoda tricolor
Chlorhoda viridis

References

External links

Arctiini
Moth genera